A chamber of commerce, or board of trade, is a form of business network. For example, a local organization of businesses whose goal is to further the interests of businesses. Business owners in towns and cities form these local societies to advocate on behalf of the business community. Local businesses are members, and they elect a board of directors or executive council to set policy for the chamber. The board or council then hires a President, CEO, or Executive Director, plus staffing appropriate to size, to run the organization.

A chamber of commerce may be a voluntary or a mandatory association of business firms belonging to different trades and industries. They serve as spokespeople and representatives of a business community. They differ from country to country.

History
The first chamber of commerce was founded in 1599 in Marseille, France, as the "Chambre de Commerce".

Another official chamber of commerce followed 65 years later, probably in Bruges, then part of the Spanish Netherlands.

The Royal Barcelona Board of Trade was established in 1758.

The world's oldest English-speaking chamber of commerce and oldest chamber of commerce in North America is the Halifax Chamber of Commerce, founded in 1750.

The Glasgow Chamber of Commerce, was founded in 1783. However, Hull Chamber of Commerce is the UK's oldest, followed by those of Leeds and of Belfast in present day Northern Ireland.

As a non-governmental institution, a chamber of commerce has no direct role in the writing and passage of laws and regulations that affect businesses. It can, however, lobby in an attempt to get laws passed that are favorable to businesses. 

The Chamber of Commerce has a long history of anti-union lobbying and union-busting in the United States at the local and federal level.

Characteristics
Membership in an individual chamber can range from a few dozen to well over 800,000, as is the case with the Paris Île-de-France Regional Chamber of Commerce and Industry. Some chamber organizations in China report even larger membership numbers. Chambers of commerce can range in scope from individual neighborhoods within a city or town up to an international chamber of commerce.

In the United States, chambers do not operate in the same manner as the Better Business Bureau in that, while the BBB has the authority to bind its members under a formal operation doctrine (and, thus, can remove them if complaints arise regarding their services), the local chamber membership is either voluntary or required by law. Some chambers are partially funded by local government, others are non-profit, and some are a combination of the two. Chambers of commerce also can include economic development corporations or groups (though the latter can sometimes be a formal branch of a local government, the groups work together and may in some cases share office facilities) as well as tourism and visitor bureaus.

Some chambers have joined state, national (such as the United States Chamber of Commerce and the British Chambers of Commerce) and even international bodies (such as Eurochambres, the International Chamber of Commerce (ICC), Worldchambers). Currently, there are about 13,000 chambers registered in the official Worldchambers Network registry, and the chamber of commerce network is the largest business network globally. This network is informal, with each local chamber incorporated and operating separately, rather than as a chapter of a national or state chamber.

Chamber models

Community, city and regional chambers

Chambers of commerce in the United States can be considered community, city, regional, state, or nationwide (United States Chamber of Commerce). City Chambers work on the local level to bring the business community together to develop strong local networks, which can result in a business-to-business exchange. In most cases, city Chambers work with their local government, such as their mayor, their city council, and local representatives to develop pro-business initiatives.
There are also bilateral chambers of commerce that link the business environments of two countries (e.g. Romanian-American Chamber of Commerce, Moldovan–American Chamber of Commerce).

Community chambers
Community chambers of commerce started in the UK and later spread to in the US, becoming city chambers of commerce as communities developed and became larger. Community chambers of commerce are smaller and most have a limit on numbers of members.

City chambers

City chambers of commerce have a long history in the US. The Charleston Chamber of Commerce is one of the oldest, dating back to colonial 1773. That same year, Boston's Chamber of Commerce organized a seminal tax protest: The Boston Tea Party.

In 2005 there were 2,800 chambers of commerce in the United States and 102 chambers representing U.S. businesses overseas. According to the Association for Chamber of Commerce Executives (ACCE), there are approximately 3,000 chambers of commerce with at least one staff person and "thousands more established as strictly volunteer entities".

State chambers
State chambers of commerce are much different from local and regional chambers of commerce, as they work on state and sometimes federal issues impacting the business community. Just as the local chamber is critical to the local business community, state chambers serve a unique function, serving as a third-party voice on important business legislation that impacts the business community and is critical in shaping legislation in their respective state. State Chambers work with their Governor, state representatives, state senators, US congressional leaders, and US Senators. In comparison with state trade associations, which serve as a voice and resource to a particular industry, state chambers are looked to as a respected voice, representing the entire business community to enhance and advocate for a better business environment.

National and international chambers
Understanding the National or International need for understanding and information is the key service that these levels of chambers of commerce provide. These services are in most cases are at no fee or cost to their members, some of the resources offer personal and/or business services that may have a very low fee (Memberships to other association like the NRA, etc.).

Compulsory or public-law chambers
Under the compulsory or public law model, enterprises of certain sizes, types, or sectors are obliged to become members of the chamber. This model is common in European Union countries (e.g. France, Germany, Italy, Spain, Austria), as well as Japan and Indonesia. The main tasks of the chambers are foreign trade promotion, vocational training, regional economic development, and general services to their members. The chambers were given responsibilities of public administration in various fields by the state which they exercise in order management. The chambers also have a consultative function; this means the chambers must be consulted whenever a new law related to industry or commerce is proposed.

In Germany, the chambers of commerce and industry (IHK - Industrie- und Handelskammer) and the chambers of skilled crafts (HwK - Handwerkskammer) are public statutory bodies with self-administration under the inspectorate of the state ministry of economy. Enterprises are members by law according to the chamber act (IHK-Gesetz) of 1956. Because of this, such chambers are much bigger than chambers under private law. IHK Munich, the biggest German chamber of commerce, has 350,000 member companies. Germany also has compulsory chambers for "free occupations" such as architects, dentists, engineers, lawyers, notaries, physicians, and pharmacists.

Continental/private law chambers
Under the private model, which exists in English-speaking countries like USA, Canada or the UK, but as well in Sweden, Finland, Norway and Denmark, companies are not obligated to become chamber members.  However, companies often become members to develop their business contacts and, regarding the local chambers (the most common level of organization), to demonstrate a commitment to the local economy.  Though governments are not required to consult chambers on proposed laws, the chambers are often contacted given their local influence and membership numbers.

Multilateral chambers
A multilateral chamber is formed of companies (and sometimes individuals) from different countries with a common business interest towards or in a specific country. It can further be active in representing the interests of local and foreign investors in that specific country, achieved through promotion and proactivity regarding the general business environment. Multilateral chambers of commerce are independent entities strengthening business relations and interactions between all economic players, and their members may benefit from a broad range of activities that enhance the visibility and reputation of their business.

Surveys
In many countries, Chambers of Commerce are a source of private-sector information. The information is usually gathered by surveying Chamber members. The British Chambers of Commerce Quarterly Economic Survey is an example of a Chambers of Commerce survey that is used by official governmental departments as a guide to the performance of the economy.

See also

 British Chambers of Commerce
 Camera di Commercio, Industria, Agricoltura e Artigianato (Italy)
 European Federation of Bilateral Chambers of Commerce
 Federation of Pakistan Chambers of Commerce & Industry
 Finnish-Russian Chamber of Commerce FRCC
 International Chamber of Commerce
 National Negro Business League
 Non-governmental organization
 Trade group
 Trade union

Further reading

 Herring, E. Pendleton (1931). "Chambres de Commerce: Their Legal Status and Political Significance". American Political Science Review. 25 (3): 689–699.

References

External links

International Chamber of Commerce / World Chambers Federation

 
1599 introductions